Marc Brian Louis is a Singaporean athlete specialising in sprints and hurdles.

Early life
Louis' father, Gilbert, first realised that Louis had running potential when he took the then eight-year-old Louis to a run at Sembawang Park. Louis dabbled in football and swimming growing up, but eventually gravitated towards track and field. He started competing for Sembawang Primary School, and subsequently, Anderson Secondary School. While he won medals at the national championships in primary school, it was only in 2017 that he won his first gold, at the 110m hurdles. He successfully defended his title the following year, adding a gold in the 400m hurdles as well. Louis was temporarily enrolled in the Singapore Sports School, but left after a year. He later graduated from the Institute of Technical Education.

International career
In 2019, Louis became the first Singaporean to win gold in the 400m hurdles (55.09s) at the 2019 Asian Youth Athletics Championships held in Hong Kong. In the same tournament, Louis also clocked 13.74s in the 110m hurdles to set a new national U-18 record. Earlier in the year, Louis had won the 400m hurdles and came in second in the 110m hurdles at the 2019 Southeast Asian Youth Athletics Championships.

In 2021, while competing at the World Athletics U-20 Championships in Nairobi, Louis set a new national U-20 record for the 110m hurdles with a time of 13.77s; he finished 11th overall. In the same year, he broke the national U-20 record for the 100m with a time of 10.39s – 0.02s off the men's record. Given his performances, he was granted deferment from National Service. This paid off at the 2021 Southeast Asian Games, where he was part of the men's quartet that won a bronze in the 4x100m relay — Singapore's first relay medal at the competition in seven years.

References

Singaporean male sprinters
2002 births
Living people
Southeast Asian Games bronze medalists for Singapore
Southeast Asian Games medalists in athletics
Competitors at the 2021 Southeast Asian Games